Nagisa or Nakisa was a noted harpist and composer of Sasanian music in the royal court Khosrow II.

Historical context
The music of Iran/Persia stretches to at least the prehistoric depictions of arched harps from 3300 to 3100 BCE, though not until the 224–651 CE Sasanian Empire is substantial information available. This influx of Sasanian records suggests a prominent musical culture in the Empire, especially in the areas dominated by Zoroastrianism. Many Sassanian Shahanshahs were ardent supporters of music, including the founder of the empire Ardashir I and Bahram V. Khosrow II was the most outstanding patron, his reign being regarded as a golden age of Persian music. In addition to Nagisa, musicians in Khosrow's service included Āzādvar-e Changi, Bāmshād, Rāmtin, Sarkash and Bārbad, who was the most famous. These musicians were usually active as minstrels, which were performers who worked as both court poets and musicians; in the Sassanian Empire there was little distinction between poetry and music.

Court service and music
Nagisa is believed to have been of Greek origin.

She collaborated with Barbad on her famous septet piece, the Royal Khosrowvani (سرود خسروانى). The main themes of her songs were in praise of  King Khosrau II.

Barbad and Nagisa greatly influenced and contributed to the Persian musical system, Khosrowvani. Accounts say that once Nakisa's audience was so moved by her performance that they passed out, or tore their garments (jame-daran).

Notes

References

Sources
Books and Chapters

 
 
  (In )
  (In )
  (In )
 
 

Journal and Encyclopedia articles

 
  
  (In )
  (In )

Further reading

 </ref>
 

7th-century women
Iranian composers
Harpists
Musicians from the Sasanian Empire
7th-century Iranian people
Women harpists
7th-century musicians
Medieval women musicians
Women from the Sasanian Empire